Sawans is a village and union council of Mianwali District in the Punjab Province of Pakistan. The Union Council is an administrative Subdivision of Mianwali Tehsil.

References

Union councils of Mianwali District